Giradie Jordan Mercer III (born March 19, 1976) is a former American football defensive tackle who played for the Philadelphia Eagles and New York Jets of the National Football League (NFL). He played college football at Marshall.

Early life and college career
After graduating from Howard D. Woodson High School in his native Washington, D.C., Mercer attended Hargrave Military Academy for one year before attending Marshall University. With the Marshall Thundering Herd, Mercer was part of the 1996 NCAA Division I-AA national championship team as a freshman. In 1998, Mercer had 96 tackles including 16 for loss and four sacks, for which he earned first-team All-Mid-American Conference honors. Mercer graduated from Marshall in December 2004 with a B.A. in general studies.

Pro football career
Mercer signed with the Carolina Panthers as an undrafted free agent in April 2000 following the 2000 NFL Draft but was released in June. On July 18, he signed with the Philadelphia Eagles. After suffering an injury during a preseason game, Mercer spent the 2000 season on injured reserve.

The Eagles waived Mercer on July 27, 2001. He signed with the New England Patriots on July 31, 2001 but was waived on August 20. On September 3, 2001, Mercer signed with the New York Jets practice squad. Mercer played in two games for the Jets in the 2002 season.

References

External links
NFL.com profile

1976 births
Living people
American football defensive tackles
Marshall Thundering Herd football players
New York Jets players
Philadelphia Eagles players
Players of American football from Washington, D.C.
H. D. Woodson High School alumni